William James George CMG (26 January 1853 – 10 March 1931) was an Australian engineer and politician who served in the Legislative Assembly of Western Australia from 1895 to 1902 and from 1909 to 1930. He was a minister in the governments of Frank Wilson, Henry Lefroy, Hal Colebatch, and James Mitchell.

Early life
George was born in West Bromwich, Staffordshire, England, to Eleanor (née Sheldon) and Henry Wellington George. He studied mechanical engineering at the Birmingham and Midland Institute, and emigrated to Australia in 1884, initially settling in Victoria. George moved to Western Australia in 1891, where he initially managed a timber plantation at Jarrahdale. He later opened a foundry in Perth, and was involved in the construction of the Victoria Dam, as well as the extensions of the Northern Railway to Mullewa and the South Western Railway to Bunbury. In 1894, George was elected to the Perth City Council, serving as a councillor until 1898.

Politics and later life
George first stood for parliament at the 1894 general election, contesting the seat of Murray. He lost to William Paterson, but after Paterson's resignation the following year he won the resulting by-election. George was re-elected at the 1897 and 1901 elections, standing as an opponent of the governments of Sir John Forrest and George Throssell, respectively. He resigned from parliament in 1902, and was appointed commissioner of railways, serving in that position until 1907, when he was succeeded by John T. Short.

At the 1908 general election, George attempted to re-enter parliament in his old seat, but was defeated by the sitting member, John McLarty. However, McLarty died the following year, and George won the by-election occasioned by his death, making him one of the few MPs in Western Australia to win multiple by-elections for the same seat. In 1916, George was appointed Minister for Works in the government of Frank Wilson. He remained Minister for Works when Henry Lefroy replaced Wilson as premier in 1917, and was also made Minister for Water Supply. George retained his portfolios during Hal Colebatch's brief period as premier in 1919, and then under James Mitchell.

In 1920, George was responsible for organising the tour of the Prince of Wales (later Edward VIII) to Western Australia, and the following year he was made a Companion of the Order of St George and St Michael (CMG). He remained a minister until the Nationalist Party was defeated at the 1924 state election, and eventually left parliament at the 1930 election. George died in Perth in March 1931, aged 78. He had married Mary Ann Nelson in 1891, with whom he had three sons and a daughter.

See also
 Members of the Western Australian Legislative Assembly

References

|-

|-

1853 births
1931 deaths
Australian Companions of the Order of St Michael and St George
Australian engineers
Burials at Karrakatta Cemetery
English emigrants to colonial Australia
Members of the Western Australian Legislative Assembly
People from West Bromwich
Nationalist Party of Australia members of the Parliament of Western Australia